Fatma Toptaş (born 25 November 1982) is a Turkish actress.

Life and career 
Toptaş studied theatre and acting at the Müjdat Gezen Art Center. In 2007, she started her career by making guest appearances in the Kanal D series Bıçak Sırtı and Show TV series Doktorlar. Her first leading role was in the 2008 comedy movie Recep İvedik as Sibel, in which she starred opposite Şahan Gökbakar. In the same year, she was cast in another comedy movie, titled Avanak Kuzenler. She further rose to prominence with her roles in the TRT series Başrolde Aşk and the 2011 ATV series Hayat Devam Ediyor. In 2013, she played the role of Serpil in Cesur Hemşire, which was broadcast on ATV. The following year she was cast in the FOX series Kiraz Mevsimi as Sibel and starred in No 309 in 2016. In 2020, she had a leading role in the FOX romantic comedy Bay Yanlış, portraying the character of Cansu Akman.

Filmography

References

External links 
 
 
 

1982 births
Turkish television actresses
Turkish film actresses
Living people